Gloria Lynne Henry is an American actress best known for her role in the film Phantasm III: Lord of the Dead.

Henry was born in Detroit, Michigan and her first experience in front of the camera was a role in the TV movie Bare Essence in 1982.  In 1994 she was cast in Don Coscarelli's Phantasm III: Lord of the Dead. Since her appearance in Phantasm III: Lord of the Dead Henry has had roles in  Robert Redford's The Horse Whisperer. She cameoed in the 2016 horror film Phantasm: Ravager reprising her role as Rocky.

After receiving her B.F.A. in theater arts at Wayne State University in Detroit, she helped to create a children's theater program at Detroit's Attic theater. She has also performed as lead singer in the critically acclaimed funk/rock band Chatter, which was originally formed by her cousin Brian Hardgroove, the bass guitarist in the legendary rap/rock group Public Enemy.

Filmography

References

External links

Actresses from Detroit
American film actresses
American television actresses
African-American actresses
Living people
Year of birth missing (living people)
21st-century African-American people
21st-century African-American women